Daniel J. Berthiaume (born January 26, 1966) is a Canadian former professional ice hockey goaltender who played six seasons in the National Hockey League (NHL) with the Winnipeg Jets, Minnesota North Stars, Los Angeles Kings, Boston Bruins, and Ottawa Senators.

Playing career
Known as "The Bandit" during his hockey career, Berthiaume was a standout goaltender in junior hockey, playing for the Drummondville Voltigeurs and Chicoutimi Saguenéens of the QMJHL. During the 1984-85 Berthiaume won 40 games for the Saguenéens, a feat made more impressive when you factor in that the team won 41 games that season.

Following this impressive year, he was drafted 60th overall by the Winnipeg Jets in the 1985 NHL Entry Draft and then played his final year of Junior hockey then made his NHL debut that spring during the NHL playoffs.

Winnipeg Jets

The Jets faced the Calgary Flames in the first round and veteran goaltender Dan Bouchard started Game One but was relieved by Brian Hayward after giving up five goals. Hayward started Game 2 but after surrendering six goals, he was yanked, and Marc Behrend finished up the game. For Game 3, with the Jets on the brink of elimination, Berthiaume made his NHL debut and dazzled making 39-saves before ultimately losing in overtime when Hall of Famer Lanny McDonald found the back of the net.

In the off-season, the Jets acquired Steve Penney from the Montreal Canadiens, and he was expected to be their starter, but Berthiaume and fellow rookie Eldon "Pokey" Reddick seized the job and formed a solid platoon, known as "Pokey and the Bandit" playing on the popular movie series Smokey and the Bandit. Berthiaume posted an impressive 18-7-3 record in 31 games during his rookie NHL season of 1986-87. During his second season in the NHL, Berthiaume assumed the starting job in Winnipeg and posted a career-best 22 wins.  The following season he struggled and ended up spending the bulk of the year toiling in the minors while Reddick took over the starters job with the Jets and veteran Alain Chevrier and rookie Bob Essensa supported him. Berthiaume was back with the Jets for the 1989-90 season, but Essensa was now the club's starting netminder.

Berthiaume came under fire for allegedly swearing at children seeking his autograph. On January 22, 1990 he was traded to the Minnesota North Stars for future considerations.Mike Smith, general manager of the Jets, said Berthiaume's trade was related to his off-ice actions. The goalie apologized on television for swearing at autograph seekers, then a day later denied the incident took place and said he had been ordered to apologize by team management.

Minnesota North Stars
Goaltender Jon Casey handled the bulk of the duties for the North Stars so Berthiuame appeared in just five games for Minnesota, managing just one win and a mediocre 3.50 goals against average.  Prior to the start of the 1990-91 training camp, Berthiaume was traded to the Los Angeles Kings for Craig Duncanson.

Los Angeles Kings
With the Kings, Berthiaume served as the back up to veteran Kelly Hrudey and performed well enough to win 20-games for the club.  However, his improved play didn't last, and the next season, 1991–92, he struggled posting a 4.04 goals against average while managing just seven wins in 19 appearances.  His uneven play ultimately cost him his job and he was shipped to Boston for future considerations on January 18, 1992.

Boston Bruins
The Bruins had Andy Moog firmly entrenched in their starter role with veteran Réjean Lemelin as his back-up, but when Lemelin suffered a groin injury, they were in need of some depth.  The Bruins brought in Berthiaume but he did little to help, winning just one of the eight starts he made for Boston.  During the off-season, the Bruins traded him back to Winnipeg for Doug Evans.

Europe and the Ottawa Senators
Berthiaume started the 1992-1993 season playing for EC Graz in the Austria, but on December 15, 1992 he signed as a free agent with the Ottawa Senators. The first-year Senators leaned heavily on goaltender Peter Sidorkiewicz and while he faired admirably considering the heavy fire he took each night in their crease, his back-up, veteran Steve Weeks, was horribly over-matched posting a 7.23 goals against average.  Berthiaume was brought in to backup Sidorkiewicz. He appeared in 25 games posting a 2-17-1 record for the lowly Senators.  In the off-season, the Senators upgraded their goaltending by acquiring Craig Billington and they promoted rookie Darrin Madeley which pushed Berthiaume out of the crease.  He made one appearance for Ottawa in the 1993-94 season and though it lasted just one minute, he surrendered two goals on two shots giving him a 120.00 goals against average for the season and zero save percentage. Late in the season he was traded to the Detroit Red Wings for Steve Konroyd, but he never suited up for the club making his final NHL appearance his one-minute stint for the Senators earlier that year.

In all, Berthiaume played in a total of 215 regular season NHL games during his career, posting a record of 81-91-21 with a goals against average of 3.67. He also appeared in 14 NHL playoff games, all with Winnipeg.

Minor Leagues
After making his final NHL appearance with the Ottawa Senators during the 1993-94 season, he spent most of the remainder of his career in the ECHL with the Roanoke Express, where he spent seven seasons in three stints and often split duties with Dave Gagnon. He also played for the ECHL's Wheeling Thunderbirds, the Detroit Vipers of the International Hockey League, and the Central Texas Stampede of the WPHL where he won the Most Outstanding Goaltender honours for the 1996-97 season. He played his last season with the Port Huron Beacons of the United Hockey League before retiring in 2005.

Berthiaume also played professional roller hockey, tending goal for Roller Hockey International's New Jersey Rockin' Rollers in 1994, Motor City Mustangs in 1995,  and Philadelphia Bulldogs in 1996.

Coaching career
Berthiaume was the assistant coach of the Roanoke Valley Vipers in the United Hockey League at the start of their 2005-06 season., but on February 6, 2006 it was announced that Berthiaume would become the head coach, replacing Jim Wiley who lost his job in mid-season.  He then coached the Virginia Military Institute Hockey team.

Personal life
Berthiaume currently lives in Hardy, Virginia, where he owns and operates Captain Bert's Fishin' Charters on Smith Mountain Lake, Virginia, a freshwater striped bass fishery. He is married and has three sons. Alongside this he coaches the local youth hockey team and his biggest fan is Freddy.

Awards
1996-97: Outstanding Goaltender (WPHL)

Career statistics

Regular season and playoffs

References

External links

Captain Bert's Fishing Charters Homepage

1966 births
Living people
Adirondack Red Wings players
Boston Bruins players
Canadian ice hockey goaltenders
Central Texas Stampede players
Chicoutimi Saguenéens (QMJHL) players
Detroit Vipers players
Drummondville Voltigeurs players
French Quebecers
EC Graz players
Greensboro Generals players
Los Angeles Kings players
Minnesota North Stars players
Moncton Hawks players
Motor City Mustangs players
New Jersey Rockin' Rollers players
Ottawa Senators players
Sportspeople from Longueuil
Port Huron Beacons players
Philadelphia Bulldogs players
Prince Edward Island Senators players
Providence Bruins players
Roanoke Express players
Sherbrooke Canadiens players
Wheeling Thunderbirds players
Winnipeg Jets (1979–1996) draft picks
Winnipeg Jets (1979–1996) players
Canadian expatriate ice hockey players in Austria